Agricultural revolution may refer to:

 First Agricultural Revolution (circa 10,000 BC), the prehistoric transition from hunting and gathering to settled agriculture (also known as the Neolithic Revolution)
 Arab Agricultural Revolution (8th–13th century), The spread of new crops and advanced techniques in the Muslim world
 British Agricultural Revolution (17th–19th century), an unprecedented increase in agricultural productivity in Great Britain (also known as the Second Agricultural Revolution)
 Scottish Agricultural Revolution (17th–19th century), the transformation into a modern and productive system
 Third Agricultural Revolution (1930s–1960s), an increase in agricultural production, especially in the developing world (also known as the Green Revolution)

See also

 Collective farming
 Land reform
 Precision agriculture
 Agrarian revolution (disambiguation)
 Green Revolution (disambiguation)
 Agronomic revolution
 
 Revolution (disambiguation)
 Agricultural
 Agrarian change